Vyacheslav Turchanov (born 3 August 1991 in Kyiv) is a professional Ukrainian football midfielder who plays for Chaika Petropavlivska Borshchahivka.

Turchanov is a product of the youth team systems of FC Arsenal Kyiv. He did not play in the first Arsenal's team and signed a contract with FC Obolon in 2009.

He was called up to play for the Ukraine national under-21 football team by trainer Pavlo Yakovenko for the Commonwealth Cup in 2012.

References

External links
Profile at FFU Official Site (Ukr)

1991 births
Living people
Ukrainian footballers
FC Obolon-Brovar Kyiv players
FC Arsenal Kyiv players
FC Poltava players
Ukrainian Premier League players
Association football midfielders
Footballers from Kyiv